Ephraim Churchill Gakpetor (born 2 September 1987) better known as Ephraimbeatz / Ephraimmusiq, is a Ghanaian record producer, singer and songwriter who specializes in Afro-pop, Hip hop, Afrobeats, R&B, Hiplife, Fuji and Highlife. He has worked with top artists like Reggie 'n' Bollie, Sarkodie, Stonebwoy, Ruff n Smooth, Shatta Wale, Dr Cryme, Pat Thomas,VIP, Nero X and others.

Discography

Singles 
"Aleke" ft Sarkodie

"Broke Heart" ft Teephlow

"For Life" ft Adina

"I Wanna Be Rich" ft Opanka

"Insane" ft Samini

"Lom Nava" ft Kofi Kinaata

Production credits 
Sarkodie ft Pat Thomas - Bra

Sarkodie ft Obrafuor  - Always On My Mind

Ruff n Smooth - Sex Machine

KK Fosu - Am Back ft. Sarkodie

Opanka - Wedding Car

Stonebwoy - Rat Race

Dr Cryme - My Lady

Stay Jay - All Be Lie

Praye ft Stay Jay - Adwoa Ataa

Stephanie Benson - Go To Girl

Rashelle Blue - Nnasonka

Nero X - Nyame Dadaw ft Teephlow

YMK - I Can't See

Opanka - Mepe No Saa ft Okyeame Kwame

Opanka - Abubro Nkosua ft Gifty Osei

Reggie 'n' Bollie – Ye Ko Di ft Dada Hafco, Drumz, Flowking Stone and Ephraim

Castro - She Dey Do Me 

Flowkingstone - Dimple

Reggie 'n' Bollie - Clarity (album)

Personal life 
Ephraim is a cousin to Ghanaian dancehall act, Stonebwoy.

Awards and nominations

References 

Ghanaian songwriters
Ghanaian composers